Delphin was a German midget submarine created during World War II.

Delphin may also refer to:

 Delphin, a Latin word and root meaning "dolphin" (also delphinus)
 Delphin, Greek sea god, the leader of the dolphins, Poseidon placed him in the sky as the constellation Delphinus
 Delphin (molecule), an anthocyanin (Delphinidin-3,5-O-diglucoside)
 Delphin Classics, a large edition of the Latin classics
 Dornier Delphin, a 1920s German single-engined commercial flying boat
 DELPH-IN, a collaboration where computational linguists worldwide developing natural language processing tools for deep linguistic processing of human language
 MV Delphin, a cruise ship owned by the India-based Vishal Cruises Pvt. Ltd.
, a West German fishing vessel in service 1952-58
 Operation Delphin, an anti-partisan operation in Croatia during World War II

People with the given name

 Delphin Enjolras (1857-1945), French academic painter
 Delphin Strungk (circa 1600-1694), German composer and organist

See also
 Delfin (disambiguation)
 Delphine (disambiguation)
 Delphinine, an alkaloid
 Jean-Delphin